Al-Awamiyah, also spelled Awamia, is a town situated in the Al-Qatif region in the Eastern Province of Saudi Arabia. , it has a population of about 25,500 people. Al-Awamiyah is bordered by the Al-Ramis farms to the east and some other farms to the west and the south. To the north side, there is a dividing line between Al-Awamiyah and the neighboring Safwa city, so the town cannot expand any more and provide housing land for its growing population. Due to this limited land, the people move out of the town and settle in nearby neighborhoods, notably Al-Nasera which is home to almost 2500 people living in 250 homes.

Geography
It is an ancient town, overlooking the Persian Gulf, in the north end of the oasis of Al-Qatif. It is located about 2.1 km south of Safwa city and about 1 km north of Al-Quddaih.  It has a mangrove area.  One of its neighborhoods is Al-Zara, which used to be a historic city and the capital of the historic province of Bahrain since the early Islamic times.

History

Despite a ban on public demonstrations in Saudi Arabia, on 29 July 2006, a pro-Hezbollah march took place in Al-Awamiyah and al-Qatif, protesting against Israel’s military campaign against Lebanon. Further protests took place on 3 August of the same year and on 28 April 2009.

In March 2009, at least four people, including a minor, were arrested after taking part in rallies which were organized to protest the warrant for the arrest of Sheikh Nimr Baqir al-Nimr, a senior Shiite cleric and Imam of a mosque in Al-Awamiyah. He had criticised attacks against Shias traveling to the tomb of Muhammad.

On 5 April 2015, a security officer was killed during a raid on suspected government opponents. According to the government, at least four citizens were detained and weapons seized.

In January 2016, Saudi Arabia executed the prominent Shiite cleric Sheikh Nimr Baqir al-Nimr, who had called for pro-democracy demonstrations, along with forty-seven people accused of terrorism.

2017 Siege
In May 2017, Al-Awamiyah was put under full siege by the Saudi military after violence broke out due to evictions. The government blamed the violence on terrorist activities. Reports indicate that between 10 and 25 people were killed from gunfire and shelling, including two infants.

Residents also reported soldiers shooting at homes, cars and everyone in streets. During the crackdown the Saudi government demolished several historical sites and many other buildings and houses in Qatif.

20,000 residents were forced to flee from their homes to survive. and the town was devastated by demolitions and fighting.

Redevelopment Project

Without consultation with local residents, a “redevelopment project” was launched in February 2018 by the governor of the Eastern Province. The main goal of the project is to enhance “security solution or the tracking of armed groups and sleeper cells”.

Economy

Al-Awamiyah's economy is based mainly on petroleum production and agriculture.

Agriculture
The town is particularly famous and known for its tomatoes which are called Ramsi tomatoes after the name of the land it is grown in, Al Ramis.

Oil
Oil pipelines surround the village from the west and north sides along with several oil wells of which some are old and others newly drilled as part of Qatif Project. Over 2 million barrels of oil pass through the village each day on the way to the Ras Tanura terminal and refinery.

Transportation

Airport
The town is served by the nearby King Fahd International Airport which is 25 minutes away with a distance of 30 km from the terminal to the town.

Highway
The town can be accessed via either two exits from Dhahran-Jubail Highway; the Airport exit or Qatif's main entrance near Awjam. By March 2019, a new highway connecting the city with its neighbouring area is planned to be launched.

Religion
Nearly all of the residents of Al-Awamiyah practice Twelver Shia Islam.

Famous people from al-Awamiyah
Ayatollah Nimr al-Nimr was executed on January 2, 2016, by the Saudi regime for his calls for democratic change. His name is praised on Al-Awamiyah's walls and his portraits hang from billboards and balconies alongside those of Husayn ibn Ali.

References

External links
 Al-Awamiyah on the web 
 Awam photo 
 Alsalam club 

Populated places in Eastern Province, Saudi Arabia
Violence against Shia Muslims in Saudi Arabia
 
Sectarian violence
Shia–Sunni sectarian violence